Greenidea ficicola is a species of aphid. It was described by Takahashi in 1921. Its color is yellowish-brown to green to dark brown, and it usually has a body 
length of 1.7-2.2 mm. It has long, hairy siphunculi (at least one-third of body length) dark brown curved outwards distally.

References

External links

Insects described in 1921
Greenideinae